Salzberg may refer to:

 Bochnia, Sivac
 Praid, Harghita County, Romania
 Salzberg, a formerly independent municipality in Bavaria, now part of Berchtesgaden
 Salzberg, a district of Neuenstein, Hesse, Germany

People with the surname
Barry Salzberg (born 1953), American businessman, accountant, and lawyer
Sharon Salzberg (born 1952), American author and Buddhist meditation teacher

See also
 Salzburg (disambiguation)
 Salsburg (disambiguation)
 Saltzberg (disambiguation)